Martha Kelner (born ) is a British sport reporter, and is the daughter of Martin Kelner, also a sports reporter. She is currently working for Sky News. Kelner has reported a number of high-profile stories, including doping in Russia, allegations of a culture of bullying in British Cycling and Chris Froome's failed doping test.

Journalism career
After graduating from the University of Sheffield, she joined her father's newspaper the Daily Mail in 2011. In March 2017, Kelner was appointed Chief Sports Reporter at The Guardian following her father's request.

In late 2018, Kelner left The Guardian to join Sky News as one of the channel's Sports Correspondents. In mid-2021, she became Sky News US correspondent covering North America.  One of the first stories she covered in the US was the 2021 Miami building collapse.

Awards
Kelner won the 2012 Young Sportswriter Award at the SJA Sports Journalism Awards. She was "highly commended" at the 2017 SJA's in the sports reporting category.
 
During her time at The Guardian, Kelner was shortlisted for the 2017 British Journalism Awards alongside Sean Ingle in the Sports Reporting category for their scoop on the Chris Froome failed drug test.

At the 2020 RTS Television Journalism Awards Kelner won the ‘Young Talent of The Year’ award.

References

Living people
British journalists
Year of birth missing (living people)
Sky News newsreaders and journalists
Women sportswriters
British sportswriters